The AFC President's Cup was an annual international association football competition between domestic clubs sides run by the Asian Football Confederation (AFC) held between 2005 and 2014.

The competition targeted emerging football nations, and was set below the AFC Champions League and AFC Cup competitions.

Competition format

Between 8 and 12 teams participated in each edition of the competition.

From 2005 to 2007, 8 clubs were placed into two groups of 4 teams. The winners and runners up would advance to the semi-final stage. All the matches were held in a single host country.

From 2008 to 2010, the tournament was increased to 11 clubs. A qualification round was created and the 11 clubs were split into three groups of 3 or 4 clubs. Each group was played in a different country. The three group winners and the best ranked runner up qualified for the finals stage, hosted in another country.

From 2011 to 2014, the tournament was increased to 12 clubs. In the qualification round, there were three groups of 4 clubs. The group winners and runners up qualify for the final stage. These 6 clubs are broken into two groups of 3. The top teams of each group qualified directly for the final.

In November 2013 the AFC announced that the 2014 AFC President's Cup would be the last edition of the tournament. Starting from 2015, league champions of "emerging countries" are eligible to participate in the AFC Cup qualifying play-off. The qualifying round for the 2016 AFC Cup, with a similar format to the AFC President's Cup (but without a final stage), was held in August 2015, which qualified two teams to the AFC Cup play-offs.

Potential revival 
On 23 December 2022, it was announced that the AFC competition structure would change from the established formats. Under the new plans, the reintroduced third tier club competition of Asian football will consist of 20 teams, divided into 4 groups of 5, with each team in their group playing each other once in a centralized location. The top two teams per group advance to the knockout stage, where the quarter-finals and semi-finals are held over two legs, with the final to be held in a neutral venue. It is currently unknown when this format will take effect or whether it will gain the AFC President's Cup moniker.

Qualification and participating nations
Qualification to the competition was to clubs from AFC-affiliated countries which fall into the AFC's 'emerging nations' category as laid out in their 'Vision Asia' document. Countries which were 'mature' and 'developing' nations were entered into the AFC Champions League and the AFC Cup, respectively. For an 'emerging nation' to have a team representing it in the competition, however, the country must have an acceptable football league. The team that represents a country in one season of the competition is the defending champion of the top-level leagues of participating countries.

Clubs from  Nepal,  Taiwan (Chinese Taipei),  Bhutan,  Sri Lanka,  Pakistan and  Cambodia were invited every year.

Clubs from  Bangladesh,  Turkmenistan,   Mongolia,  Philippines and  North Korea were also invited in some of the years of the competition.

Some participating countries –  Palestine,  Myanmar,  Tajikistan and  Kyrgyzstan  – applied for an upgrade to the AFC Cup, so their club teams subsequently played in that competition.

Other nations that could enter a team, but never did so are:  Brunei,  Timor-Leste,   Guam,  Laos,  Macau and  Afghanistan.

In March 2012 the AFC announced that the  Northern Mariana Islands were approved to participate in the AFC Challenge Cup and AFC President's Cup if they fulfilled the criteria. However, they never entered a team.

Results

Performance

Performance by nation

Performance by club

By coach

Awards

Top scorers

Best players

See also
 AFC President's Cup records and statistics

References

External links

AFC President's Cup – RSSSF

 
Defunct Asian Football Confederation club competitions
Recurring sporting events established in 2005
Recurring sporting events disestablished in 2014
2005 establishments in Asia
2014 disestablishments in Asia